The Hanalei River on the island of Kauai in Hawaii flows north from the eastern slopes of Mount Waialeale for  until it reaches the Pacific Ocean at Hanalei Bay as an estuary.

The lower, flatter portion of the river flows by Hanalei National Wildlife Refuge and many taro farms (60% of Hawaii's taro is grown in this area).  The Hanalei River provides habitat for a number of amphidromous species, including gobies (5 native varieties), two native species of crustacean, the hīhīwai (Neritina granosa, an edible snail), and in its upper reaches, a threatened species of highly adapted snail (Newcomb's snail, Erinna newcombi).

The Hanalei was designated an American Heritage River by US President Bill Clinton on July 30, 1998.
The major bridge across the river (still one lane) is on Hawaii Route 560, which is listed on the National Register of Historic Places listings in Hawaii.

See also
Hanalei, Hawaii
List of rivers in Hawaii

References

External links

Hanalei Watershed Hui
EPA American Heritage River: Hanalei

American Heritage Rivers
Rivers of Kauai